Gibbs and Canning Limited was an English manufacturer of terracotta and, in particular, architectural terracotta, located in Glascote, Tamworth, and founded in 1847.

The company manufactured a wide range of terracotta and faience: statues of lions and pelicans to adorn the Natural History Museum in London; architectural terracotta for banks and schools; and garden urns and planters. By the 1950s, when the factory finally closed, it was best known for more practical items, such as drainage pipes, sinks, vases and jars.

Today, there is little evidence of the factory in Glascote, but the legacy lives on in the decoration and plumbing of many buildings in Britain’s major towns and cities.

Buildings featuring Gibbs and Canning terracotta

Natural History Museum, South Kensington, London. Designed by Alfred Waterhouse. Both the interior and exterior statues, and the block-work, are Gibbs and Canning (G&C).
Royal Albert Hall, South Kensington, London. The buff, ornamental terracotta on the exterior.
142 Holborn Bars, Prudential Assurance Building, Holborn, London. Designed by Alfred Waterhouse with all the red terracotta by G&C.
Methodist Central Hall, Birmingham. Ornate, red terracotta.
Imperial Buildings, Victoria Street/Whitechapel corner, Liverpool, 1879. Cream terracotta.
Church of the Holy Name of Jesus, Manchester. Roof vaulting of hollow terracotta blocks, 1869–71.
Manchester Town Hall Designed, again by Alfred Waterhouse.
Victoria Law Courts, Birmingham. Interior buff-coloured terracotta.

References

Further reading
Streluk, A. (2006) "Gibbs & Canning of Glascote, Tamworth", Glazed Expressions, No.55 Spring

External links

Research page including details of many buildings that used Gibbs and Canning terracotta
Chemlinski Gallery - English Terracotta
Tamworth Castle - has a small display Gibbs and Canning wares and manufacturing techniques

Building materials companies of the United Kingdom
Ceramics manufacturers of England
Staffordshire pottery
Terracotta
Design companies established in 1847
Manufacturing companies established in 1847
1847 establishments in England